Arundhati is a Marathi Indian soap opera created and produced by Ekta Kapoor under her banner Balaji Telefilms. The series premiered on 10 October 2011 and ended on 14 April 2012 which aired on Zee Marathi. The series premiered from Monday to Saturday at 7.30 pm by replacing Bhagyalakshmi.

Plot
Arundhati, a simple town girl works in blind school and is loved by all while Digvijay, a successful but is a blind business tycoon. His mother Kamini gets him married to Arundhati keeping the secret unknown to all. On the wedding day, Digvijay trip and falls on the dias seeking help as a blind person does and the secret comes out. Arundhati had feelings for Digvijay but due to the fact which was kept secret, she thought of getting betrayed but later copes up and help Digvijay. Later he undergoes a surgery and gets his vision. Also, Arundhati starts getting taste of Kamini's cunning behavior and greed for wealth and property. Digvijay unknown of the fact Arundhati tells the truth but instead Kamini creates misunderstanding between the two. Later, Arundhati exposes Kamini and the family leaves the house and Kamini alone and settle away.
Later, Kamini realises her mistakes and asks for forgiveness. Arundhati forgives but Digvijay doesn't. Later, Kamini finally convinces Digvijay and later dies due to a heart attack.

Cast
 Bhakti Desai as Arundhati
 Prasad Jawade as Digvijay
 Ravindra Mahajani as Aabasaheb
 Ashwini Ekbote as Kamini
 Nikhil Rajeshirke as Shantanu
 Vikas Patil as Nitin

References

External links
 

Balaji Telefilms television series
2011 Indian television series debuts
2012 Indian television series endings
Marathi-language television shows
Zee Marathi original programming